Povegliano Veronese is a comune (municipality) in the Province of Verona in the Italian region Veneto, located about  west of Venice and about  from the Catullo Airport (Verona's Airport).

Demographic evolution

Twin towns
Povegliano Veronese is twinned with:

  Ockenheim, Germany
  La Concepcion, Ecuador

References

External links
 www.comune.poveglianoveronese.vr.it/

Cities and towns in Veneto